Ilūkste Municipality was a municipality in Selonia, Latvia. The municipality was formed in 2003 by merging Pilskalne Parish, Šēdere Parish, Bebrene Parish and Ilūkste town. In 2009 it absorbed Dviete parish, Eglaine parish and Subate town with its rural area the administrative centre being Ilūkste. In 2010 the rural area of Subate was reorganised as a separate territorial entity, Prode Parish. The population in 2020 was 6,412.

On 1 July 2021, Ilūkste Municipality ceased to exist and its territory was merged into the newly-formed Augšdaugava Municipality.

Demographics

Ethnic composition 

As of 1 January 2010 the ethnic composition of the municipality is as follows:

See also 
 Administrative divisions of Latvia
 Kreis Illuxt

References 

 
Former municipalities of Latvia